Anestis is a Greek given name. Notable people with the name include:

Anestis Anastasiadis (born 1983), Greek footballer
Anestis Argyriou (born 1988), Greek footballer
Anestis Agritis (born 1981), Greek footballer
Anestis Chatziliadis (born 1991), Greek footballer
Anestis Delias (1912–1944), Greek bouzouki player
Anestis Dalakouras (born 1993), Greek volleyball player
Anestis Logothetis (1921–1994), Austrian avant-garde composer

See also
 Anestis (surname)

Greek masculine given names